Rae Town is a Kingston, Jamaica neighborhood by Kingston Harbor. Ole Hits is a weekly reggae dance event held Sundays in the neighborhood. Cremo Company ice cream, Caimans, and Molasses Factory operated in the area.

References

Neighbourhoods in Kingston, Jamaica
Populated places in Saint Andrew Parish, Jamaica